Sterling is a city in Whiteside County, Illinois, United States. The population was 14,782 at the 2020 census, down from 15,370 in 2010. Formerly nicknamed "Hardware Capital of the World", the city has long been associated with manufacturing and the steel industry.

Geography
Sterling lies along the north bank of the Rock River, opposite its twin city, Rock Falls. The terrain is mostly flat. The land immediately outside of town is almost entirely farmland. The prairie soil is part of one of the world's most fertile growing areas.

Demographics

As of the census of 2000, there were 15,596 people, 6,234 households, and 3,946 families residing in the city. The racial makeup of the city was 84.36% White, 2.25% African American, 0.41% Native American, 0.81% Asian, 0.01% Pacific Islander, 9.82% from other races, and 2.35% from two or more races. Hispanic or Latino of any race were 19.24% of the population.

There were 6,234 households, out of which 30.3% had children under the age of 18 living with them, 47.2% were married couples living together, 12.2% had a female householder with no husband present, and 36.7% were non-families. 31.4% of all households were made up of individuals, and 14.0% had someone living alone who was 65 years of age or older. The average household size was 2.41 and the average family size was 3.04.

In the city, the population was spread out, with 25.1% under the age of 18, 9.5% from 18 to 24, 28.7% from 25 to 44, 19.8% from 45 to 64, and 16.9% who were 65 years of age or older. The median age was 36 years. For every 100 females, there were 90.9 males. For every 100 females age 18 and over, there were 86.9 males.

The median income for a household in the city was $37,664, and the median income for a family was $45,531. Males had a median income of $33,047 versus $21,944 for females. The per capita income for the city was $19,432. About 7.6% of families and 10.8% of the population were below the poverty line, including 17.0% of those under age 18 and 5.4% of those age 65 or over.

History

In 1834, Hezekiah Brink built the first cabin in what was to become Harrisburg. Two years later, William Kirkpatrick settled downstream in an area that became Chatham. In 1838, Harrisburg and Chatham merged to become the Town of Sterling in an effort to become the county seat. The name Sterling was chosen to honor Major James Sterling, who distinguished himself in the area during the Blackhawk War in 1832. On February 16, 1857, Sterling was incorporated as a city by state law.

On July 18, 1856, Abraham Lincoln visited Sterling to speak at a rally for the presidential candidate John C. Fremont. He spent the night at the home of Sheriff William Manahan, which has since been preserved and renovated into the Lincoln-Manahan Home. He gave his speech in Propheter Park, where a statue has been erected in his honor.

The Rock River failed to become a major navigational route as once hoped, but it provided power for the saw and grist mills, and later to a booming industrial base. In 1856, the first rail lines were laid in the area. With the power from the river and the transportation provided by the railroads, Sterling's business and industry grew. During the late 19th and early 20th century, the community's industrial bedrock was laid with the founding of Northwestern Steel & Wire Co., Lawrence Brothers Inc, National Manufacturing Co., The Frantz Manufacturing Company, and the Wahl Clipper Corporation.

Sterling has diversified and adapted to the 21st century. Its industrial base has expanded; the city has filled two industrial parks and made development for a third and fourth. Retail sales for the region have expanded as Sterling has emerged as a regional retail hub. Outside the city, the landscape is dominated by agricultural fields that typify most of the Midwest.

The cities of Sterling, Nebraska, and Sterling, Colorado, were both founded by former residents of Sterling, Illinois, as they branched out across the West.

Education
Sterling is served by Community Unit School District 5, which operates Sterling High School, Challand Middle School, Franklin Elementary, Jefferson Elementary, Lincoln Elementary, and Washington Elementary Schools. Wallace School serves as Sterling's public pre-K institution, along with classrooms in Franklin and Jefferson Elementary Schools.

Sterling is also home to the Whiteside Area Career Center, adjacent to Sterling High School.  WACC hosts a variety of vocational courses, available to students of its member schools in the Sauk Valley.

The Roman Catholic Diocese of Rockford runs two schools in the city: St. Mary's School, serving as both grade school and middle school, and Newman Central Catholic High School. These schools serve both local parishes, Sacred Heart Church and St. Mary's Church.

Additionally, Sterling is host to one Protestant school: Christ Lutheran (K-8).

Parks

Sterling City Parks
Central Park is at Brinks Circle.
Dale Park is at Locust Street and 2nd Street.
Flock Park is at Locust Street and 8th Street.
Lincoln Park is at 16th Avenue and 4th Street.
Platt Park is at 20th Avenue and 7th Street.
Wallace Park is at Avenue G and 5th Street.

Sterling Park District Parks
Douglas Park was developed in 1955 when Cellular Concrete Contractors donated  of property for a park in the Douglas Park Subdivision.  Douglas Park is at Chestnut Avenue and Lynn Boulevard.

It officially opened a  course in 1978 and is a popular place for joggers and walkers to go. Eberley Park is at Douglas Drive and West LeFevre Road.

The Gartner Park Baseball Complex was developed in 1961 and included 7 regulation baseball diamonds and a playground area.  Since then, there has been renovation on the diamonds to include press boxes, lights and field improvements.  Gartner Park is on West LeFevre Road.

Harry Kidd Field was acquired through an Open Space Land & Water Grant in 1976.  It is used by Sterling Jr. Tackle as their Home field for the 5th-8th grade tackle program.  Harry Kidd Field is at West 7th Street and Woodburn Avenue.

The Hoover Park property was purchased from Edward Hoover in 1941 as an extension of Sinnissippi Park.  The two parks are connected via the S.M.A.R.T. trail system.  Hoover Park is at 37th Avenue and Woodlawn Road.

Kilgour Park was purchased in 1935.  This  park was once the site of Civil War Colonel William M. Kilgour's own personal farm.  The site is now known for the Imagination Station play area and basketball and tennis courts.  Kilgour Park is at West LeFevre Road and Avenue F.

Lawrence Park was acquired in 1925.  It is considered the first park of Sterling, and was named for the Lawrence family in honor of their bequests to the then Sterling-Coloma Township Park District. The pool was constructed in the late 1920s and is the home pool for the Sterling Sterling Stingray Swim Club.  Lawrence Park is on the Avenue G Island.

The Sinnissippi Dam Walkway and Martin's Landing officially opened on September 20, 2008, after years of combined effort from the Sterling Park District, the City of Sterling, the City of Rock Falls, the Coloma Township Park District and the Illinois Department of Natural Resources.  The Sinnissippi Dam Walkway provides a link between the ever-expanding trail system in Sterling and the Hennepin Feeder Canal in Rock Falls. The Sinnissippi Dam Walkway offers bicyclists, runners, walkers and other recreational users a safe and scenic route across the Rock River and Martin's Landing is the welcoming point to Sterling and the entry to the ever-expanding trail system in Sterling.  Martin's Landing and the Sinnissippi Dam Walkway are at 10th Avenue and 2nd Street (behind the Dillon Home Museum).

In 1971, the Harbor House, park roads and lighting, a  launch ramp, a  main dock and parking lots were developed through a 100% funded grant. Since the leasing of Oppold, Oxbow Lake was dredged and boat slips, two picnic shelters, picnic units, playground areas, landscaping, and more has been added. Oppold Marina is on Stouffer Road.

The Propheter Park property was donated to the Sterling Park District in 1986 by Bob Propheter.  The park was named and dedicated in his honor.  Propheter Park is at 6th Avenue and East 6th Street.

In 1967, the Park District acquired the  site known as Scheid Park.  In the late 1990s, major renovations include improvement of the basketball courts, soccer field, playground equipment, and the addition of a shelter.  Scheid Park is at Woodburn Avenue and West 11th Street.

The largest of the Sterling Park District parks, Sinnissippi Park was acquired in parcels beginning in 1934.  It is the site for Hopewillian Indian Mounds, which is on the National Register of Historic Places.  Sinnissippi Park is linked to Hoover Park via the S.M.A.R.T. trail system.  Sinnissippi Park is on Sinnissippi Road.

The Skate Park was built in 2004 by the Sterling Park District.  It is behind the Duis Recreation Center and the Frasor Center at St. Mary's Road and Third Avenue. It is no longer operational and was taken down in the summer of 2020 due to vandalism and falling popularity of skate park related sports.

The  site of Thomas Park was purchased from Sterling Farms, Inc., in 1966 in a joint venture with the Sterling School District (where Franklin School was built).  The park was named after Ralph Thomas, former president and member of the Board of Commissioners from 1944 to 1959.  Thomas Park is at 12th Avenue & Lynn Boulevard. During the winter, it serves as an ice hockey rink for hockey enthusiasts.

Notable people

 Frances Cleveland Axtell, legislator; born in Sterling
 Chris Birch, Alaska Senator
 Terry Brooks, fantasy author
 Keith L. Brown, United States diplomat
 Clarence Clinton Coe, member of the Wisconsin State Assembly
 Steve Eddy, pitcher with the California Angels
 Don E. Fehrenbacher, historian of politics, slavery, and Abraham Lincoln, born in Sterling
 Virgil Ferguson, state senator, spent most of adult life in Sterling
 Paul J. Flory, Nobel laureate in chemistry; born in Sterling
 Mike Foltynewicz, pitcher for the Houston Astros and Atlanta Braves; born in Sterling
 Austin Hubbard, mixed martial artist competing in the UFC; born in Sterling
 Jakob Junis, pitcher for the Kansas City Royals in Major League Baseball
 Dan Kolb, pitcher for the Texas Rangers, Milwaukee Brewers, Atlanta Braves, and the Pittsburgh Pirates; born in Sterling
 Tim Lawson, author
 Joel Ryce-Menuhin, classical pianist and psychologist
 Harry B. Mulliken, early 20th century New York City architect; born in Sterling
 Michael Bryan Murphy, musician; former lead singer for REO Speedwagon
 Jigar Shah, clean energy entrepreneur
 Jacqueline Grennan Wexler, American Roman Catholic nun and academic administrator
 Jesse Lynch Williams, awarded the first Pulitzer Prize for Drama in 1918

See also
 Northwestern Steel and Wire
 Paul W. Dillon Home
 Edward N. Kirk
 Newman Central Catholic High School

References

External links
 City of Sterling Web Site
 Sterling Park District

 
Cities in Illinois
Micropolitan areas of Illinois
Cities in Whiteside County, Illinois
Populated places established in 1838
1838 establishments in Illinois